Ghanaians in France consist of Ghanaians resident in France and their descendants living and working in France.

History 
Ghanaian immigrants in France are a very recent group of immigrants. Even if there were some Ghanaians before the 2000s, they were not very visible, embedded in the big community of Africans in France (who were mostly composed of francophone Africans). However, this community has become more and more numerous.

Distribution 
There are Ghanaians in the banlieues (suburbs) of Paris, but also in Alsace because it's a region close to Germany, a country with a strong Ghanaian community.

References 

African diaspora in France
Society of France
French people of Ghanaian descent
Ethnic groups in France
Immigration to France by country of origin